The Barron Knights are a British humorous pop rock group, originally formed in 1959 in Leighton Buzzard, Bedfordshire, as the Knights of the Round Table.

Career
They started out as a straight pop group, and spent a couple of years touring and playing in English dance halls before making their way to Hamburg, Germany.  Bill Wyman, later of the Rolling Stones, has written that the Barron Knights were the first group he saw with an electric bass, at a performance in Aylesbury in July 1961, inspiring him to take up the instrument. In 1963, at the invitation of Brian Epstein, they were one of the support acts on The Beatles' Christmas shows at the Finsbury Park Astoria in London, and later became one of the few acts to tour with both the Beatles and the Rolling Stones. Their debut single was "Let's Face It" / "Never Miss Chris" released in 1962 by Fontana Records (H.368). They also made their debut on BBC Television in this year performing on the children's programme Let's Go! 

For studio recordings they often brought in additional session musicians as required, including in 1968 a then unknown Reg Dwight (later known as Elton John).

They first came to fame in 1964 with the number "Call Up the Groups" (Parts 1 and 2). It overcame copyright restrictions and parodied a number of the leading pop groups of the time including the Searchers, Freddie and the Dreamers, the Dave Clark Five, the Bachelors, the Rolling Stones, and the Beatles. The song imagined the various artists singing about being conscripted, or "called up" into the British Army, although actual conscription had ended in 1960. The single climbed to number 3 in the UK Singles Chart. As an example, the song "Bits and Pieces" by The Dave Clark Five was parodied as "Boots and Blisters". They then followed this parody theme with two more hit singles "Pop Go the Workers" (1965) and "Merry Gentle Pops" (1966), while continuing to work the cabaret circuit, as they do internationally to this day.

In 1967, the group released the single "Lazy Fat People", a satirical song written by Pete Townshend of The Who. In 1974 they toured South Africa with Petula Clark. By 1977 CBS Records had signed the group, bringing a resurgence in popularity, with "Live in Trouble" reaching number 7 in the UK Singles Chart. It was their first hit for over nine years. "Angelo" was just one song parodied on "Live in Trouble". Their 1978 release "A Taste of Aggro", which parodied "Rivers of Babylon", "Matchstalk Men and Matchstalk Cats and Dogs" and "The Smurf Song", became the group's biggest hit with sales of over one million, reaching number 3 in the UK chart.

They achieved four other UK hit singles in the 1960s and 1970s but their only US Billboard Hot 100 charted single, "The Topical Song", was another comedic parody written by the American poet Robert Spring White. Based upon Supertramp's "The Logical Song", White, who also took the 1980 American Song Festival award in the folk category for "Where Does The River Go", confined his humorous lyric compositions to the Barron Knights.

The group also produced Christmas specials on Channel 4 Television in 1983 and 1984 which continued to be repeated throughout the decade, a mix of sketches and songs with a comedy backbone for which the group brought in comedy writer Barry Faulkner (Grumbleweeds, Tom O'Connor, Week Ending, Russ Abbot's Madhouse) to write sketches and links.  In 1986, they sang a parody of the Jimmy Dean song "Big Bad John", called "Big Bad Bond".  It was a tongue-in-cheek reference to the Australian entrepreneur Alan Bond and his involvement in Australia's victory in the 1983 America's Cup. The single was released by WEA, and had "The Loan Arranger" on the B-side, both taken from their album California Girls.

, the group continued to perform for a worldwide audience, with a line-up featuring only Pete Langford from the original band members. Founding member, Barron Antony, retired on 5 October 1985, and fellow founding member Butch Baker retired in January 2007, and was replaced by Len Crawley. The Barron Knights' original lead singer, Duke D'Mond, died on 9 April 2009.

Original band member details
 Barron Antony (born Antony Michael John Osmond, 15 June 1934, RAF Abingdon, Abingdon, Berkshire, England) – bassist, vocalist
 Peter 'Peanut' Langford (born 10 April 1943, Durham, England) – guitar, keyboards, vocalist
 Duke D'Mond (born Richard Edward Palmer, 25 February 1943, Dunstable, Bedfordshire, England, died 9 April 2009, Oxford) – vocalist
 Butch Baker (born Leslie John Baker, 16 July 1941, Amersham, Buckinghamshire, England) – lead guitarist, vocalist
 Dave Ballinger (born David Alan Ballinger, 17 January 1939, Slough, Berkshire, England) – drummer

Discography

Albums

Singles

See also
List of Epic Records artists
List of performances on Top of the Pops
List of songs about London

References

External links
 The Barron Knights Home Page
  The British Beat Boom website biography
 The Barron Knights – One Man's Meat

British comedy musical groups
English pop rock music groups
Comedy rock musical groups
Epic Records artists
British parodists
Parody musicians
Musical groups established in 1959
1959 establishments in England
People from Leighton Buzzard
Musical groups from Bedfordshire